Willi Waltner (25 January 1934 – 26 July 1966) was a German wrestler. He competed in the men's Greco-Roman heavyweight at the 1952 Summer Olympics.

References

1934 births
1966 deaths
German male sport wrestlers
Olympic wrestlers of Germany
Wrestlers at the 1952 Summer Olympics
Sportspeople from Cologne